Madam Temptation (Spanish:Señora Tentación) is a 1948 Mexican drama film directed by José Díaz Morales and starring David Silva, Susana Guízar and Ninón Sevilla.

The film's sets were designed by the art director Luis Moya.

Cast

References

Bibliography 
 Andrew Grant Wood. Agustin Lara: A Cultural Biography. OUP USA, 2014.

External links 
 

1948 films
1948 drama films
Mexican drama films
1940s Spanish-language films
Films directed by José Díaz Morales
Mexican black-and-white films
1940s Mexican films